Marc Moro (born July 17, 1977) is a Canadian former professional hockey player who was the first captain for the Toronto Maple Leafs' American Hockey League (AHL) affiliate team, the Toronto Marlies. He was drafted in the second round, 27th overall by the Ottawa Senators in the 1995 NHL Entry Draft.

Biography
As a youth, Moro played in the 1991 Quebec International Pee-Wee Hockey Tournament with a minor ice hockey team from Markham, Ontario.

Moro played junior hockey with the Kingston Frontenacs from 1993 to 1997, and the Sault Ste. Marie Greyhounds for part of the 1996–97 season. Moro played his first pro hockey game for the Prince Edward Island Senators of the AHL during the 1995–96 season before being sent back to junior.

Marc Moro never played a game in an Ottawa Senators jersey. In 1996, his rights were traded to the Mighty Ducks of Anaheim with Ted Drury for Jason York and Shaun Van Allen. He made his National Hockey League (NHL) debut with the Mighty Ducks, playing in one game during the 1997–98 season. He was dealt the next season with goaltender Chris Mason to the Nashville Predators for goaltender Dominic Roussel.

Marc Moro was selected as the first captain in Toronto Marlies history in October 2005. Moro was also the St. John's Maple Leafs' last captain in their 15-year history during the 2004–05 AHL season.

On August 13, 2007, Moro announced his retirement.  Moro worked as an analyst during Maple Leaf games on Leafs TV during the 2007-08 season, and has since become president of a construction consulting company in Toronto.

Career statistics

References

External links

1977 births
Canadian people of Italian descent
Canadian ice hockey defencemen
Cincinnati Mighty Ducks players
Living people
Kingston Frontenacs players
Mighty Ducks of Anaheim players
Milwaukee Admirals players
Milwaukee Admirals (IHL) players
Nashville Predators players
Ottawa Senators draft picks
Prince Edward Island Senators players
St. John's Maple Leafs players
Sault Ste. Marie Greyhounds players
Ice hockey people from Toronto
Toronto Maple Leafs announcers
Toronto Maple Leafs players
Toronto Marlies players